The following is a list of notable deaths in October 2008.

Entries for each day are listed alphabetically by surname. A typical entry lists information in the following sequence:
 Name, age, country of citizenship at birth, subsequent country of citizenship (if applicable), reason for notability, cause of death (if known), and reference.

October 2008

1
turdo adams, 89, American actor (Twelve O'Clock High), heart failure.
Ian Collier, 65, British singer and actor (Doctor Who). 
Robert Couturier, 103, French sculptor.
Bill Flagg, 79, British Anglican prelate, Bishop of Peru (1973–1977).
Daphney Hlomuka, 59, South African actress, kidney cancer.
Val Jansante, 88, American football player (Pittsburgh Steelers).
Detlef Lewe, 69, German canoeist, 1972 Olympic bronze medalist, after brief illness.
House Peters, Jr., 92, American actor (Mr. Clean), pneumonia.
Nick Reynolds, 75, American folk musician (The Kingston Trio), acute respiratory disease.
Arlene Sherman, c. 61, American television producer.
LeJuan Simon, 27, Trinidadian athlete, complications of pulmonary hypertension.
Poornam Viswanathan, 88, Indian actor, multiple organ failure.
Boris Yefimov, 109, Russian political cartoonist.

2
George Anselevicius, 85, Lithuanian-born American architect.
Bonnie Bluh, 82, American feminist writer, aortic dissection.
*Choi Jin-sil, 39, South Korean actress, suicide by hanging.
Rob Guest, 58, British-born New Zealand actor and singer, stroke.
Anna Hagemann, 89, German Olympic athlete. 
Shaharom Husain, 88, Malaysian historian.
Kataejar Jibas, 55, Marshallese politician, mayor of Bikini Atoll since 2007, injuries from a car accident.
John Sjoberg, 67, British footballer (Leicester City F.C.).

3
Zulfiqar Ahmed, 82, Pakistani cricketer, cardiac arrest.
Mahir al-Zubaydi, Iraqi al-Qaeda leader, shot.
Geoffrey Davis, Australian doctor.
Allan Deane, 85, New Zealand cricketer.
Jean Foyer, 87, French politician, Minister of Justice (1962–1967) and Minister of Health (1972–1973).
Frederick Charles Hurrell, 80, British Royal Air Force officer.
Hugo Ironside, 90, British soldier.
Johnny "J", 39, American hip-hop producer, apparent suicide by jumping.
Rajendra Singh Lodha, 66, Indian accountant, chairman of the Birla Corporation, heart attack.
George Thomson, Baron Thomson of Monifieth, 87, British businessman and journalist, MP (1952–1973), viral infection.

4
Harry Bath, 83, Australian National Rugby League player and coach, after long illness.
Craig Fertig, 66, American football player and coach, kidney failure.
Al Gallodoro, 95, American jazz musician, after brief illness. 
Derek Jones, 81, British colonial official, Hong Kong Secretary for Economic Services (1973–1976), Environment (1976–1981).
Saul Laskin, 90, Canadian politician, first mayor of Thunder Bay, heart attack. 
Peter Vansittart, 88, British writer.

5
Ernest Beutler, 80, American hematologist, lymphoma.
Kim Chan, 90, Chinese-born American actor.
Leopoldo Elia, 82, Italian legal scholar, President of the Constitutional Court, Minister of Foreign Affairs (1994).
Servando González, 85, Mexican documentary film director.
Mohamed Moumou, 43, Iraqi al-Qaeda second-in-command, shot.
Howard G. Munson, 84, American judge.
Iba N'Diaye, 80, Senegalese painter, heart failure.
Ken Ogata, 71, Japanese actor (The Ballad of Narayama), liver cancer.
Hans Richter, 89, German actor and director (Emil and the Detectives).
Lloyd Thaxton, 81, American television personality, multiple myeloma.

6 
Murad Abro, 42, Pakistani politician, road accident.
Peter Avery, 85, British scholar and Iranian specialist.
Larry Belcher, 61, American politician, member of Kentucky House of Representatives (1999–2002, since 2006), car accident. 
Paul Clark, 68, British judge.
Peter Cox, 82, Australian politician.
Paavo Haavikko, 77, Finnish poet and playwright, after long illness.
Olga Kaljakin, 57, American art director and film poster artist (The Last Samurai, Field of Dreams, Moonstruck), emphysema.
Nadia Nerina, 80, South African ballerina.
Janaka Perera, 62, Sri Lankan general and politician, bomb blast injuries.
Anne Margrethe Strømsheim, 94, Norwegian resistance member.
Sir John Young, 88, Australian jurist, Chief Justice of Victoria (1974–1991), Lieutenant-Governor of Victoria (1974–1995). Willow wilson died at 13 on oct 8 2008

7
Peter Copley, 93, British actor. 
Cozzene, 28, American Thoroughbred racehorse, euthanized.
Bruce Dal Canton, 66, American baseball player, esophageal cancer.
Leslie Hardman, 95, British Army Jewish chaplain at liberation of Bergen-Belsen.
George Kissell, 88, American baseball coach (St. Louis Cardinals), car accident.
Ivar Mathisen, 88, Norwegian Olympic silver medal-winning (1948) sprint canoer.
DeWayne McKinney, 47, American ATM entrepreneur wrongfully convicted of murder, traffic accident.
George Emil Palade, 95, Romanian cell biologist, Nobel Prize laureate (Physiology or Medicine, 1974).
Princess Rooney, 28, American Thoroughbred racehorse, euthanized.
Miles Richmond, 85, British painter.

8
David Akutagawa, 71, Japanese Canadian martial artist, heart attack.
Chicão, 59, Brazilian footballer.
Jim Drake, 77, British rugby league player.
Bob Friend, 70, British newscaster, cancer.
Gidget Gein, 39, American bassist (Marilyn Manson), drug overdose.
Pete Goegan, 74, Canadian ice hockey player (Detroit Red Wings, Minnesota North Stars, New York Rangers).
Tanya Halesworth, 73, Australian television news presenter, cancer.
Eileen Herlie, 90, British-born American actress (Hamlet, All My Children), complications of pneumonia.
Norman Hogg, Baron Hogg of Cumbernauld, 70, British politician, MP (1979–1997), cancer.
Cliff Malone, 83, Canadian ice hockey player (Montreal Canadiens), heart failure.
Les McCrabb, 93, American baseball player (Philadelphia Athletics).

9
Karl Albert, 87, German philosopher and professor.
Albert Hall, 74, American hammer throw champion, complications from Alzheimer's disease.
Milan Kymlicka, 72, Czech-born Canadian composer and conductor. 
David Lett, 69, American winemaker, heart failure. 
Bert Loxley, 74, British footballer and manager, after long illness.
Ardeshir Mohasses, 70, Iranian illustrator and cartoonist, heart attack.
Judith Wachs, 70, American musician (Voice of the Turtle) and promoter of Sephardic music, cancer.

10
James Benson, 63, American entrepreneur (SpaceDev), brain tumor.
Alton Ellis, 70, Jamaican singer, lymphatic cancer.
Sid Hudson, 93, American baseball player.
Muhammad Aslam Khan Khattak, 100, Pakistani politician and diplomat, after long illness.
Gerald Leeman, 86, American wrestler, Olympic silver medallist (1948).
Kazuyoshi Miura, 61, Japanese businessman, murder suspect, suicide by hanging. 
Javad Nurbakhsh, 81, Iranian spiritual leader.
Jiřina Petrovická, 85, Czech actress.
Alexey Prokurorov, 44, Russian cross-country skier, car accident.
Leo Rosner, 90, Polish-born Australian musician, Holocaust survivor in Schindler's List, complications of Alzheimer's disease.
Summing, 30, American thoroughbred racehorse and sire, natural causes.
Kurt Weinzierl, 77, Austrian actor.

11
Vija Artmane, 79, Latvian actress, complications from strokes.
Daniel Awdry, 84, British politician, MP for Chippenham (1962–1979).
William Claxton, 80, American photographer, complications of heart failure.
Kevin Foster, 39, American baseball player, renal cancer. 
Jörg Haider, 58, Austrian politician, Governor of Carinthia (1989–1991, since 1999), leader of the FPÖ and BZÖ, car accident.
Russ Hamilton, 76, British singer.
Ernst-Paul Hasselbach, 42, Surinamese-born Dutch television producer, car accident.
Neal Hefti, 85, American composer ("Batman Theme", "The Odd Couple Theme"), heart attack.
William J. Higginson, 69, American poet and translator.
Randy Johnston, 20, American male model, accidental drug overdose. 
Hayley Marie Kohle, 26, Canadian fashion model, suicide by jumping.
Badar Munir, 68, Pakistani actor, complications of cardiac arrest.
Scarlett, 13, American stray cat, name source of the Scarlett Award for Animal Heroism, animal euthanasia.
Mark Shivas, 70, British film and television producer, Head of BBC Drama (1988–1993).
Allan Spear, 71, American politician, first openly gay member of Minnesota Senate (1973–2000), complications of heart surgery.
Gil Stratton, 86, American television and radio sportscaster (Los Angeles Rams, Santa Anita Racetrack), heart failure.
Nelson Symonds, 75, Canadian jazz guitarist, heart attack,

12
Sukha Bose, 77, Indian cricket umpire.
Lenvil Elliott, 57, American football player (San Francisco 49ers, Cincinnati Bengals), heart attack.
Chuck Evans, 41, American football player (Minnesota Vikings), heart failure.
Sir Dick Franks, 88, British Head of the Secret Intelligence Service (1979–1982).
Roy K. Moore, 94, American FBI agent known for civil rights investigations, pneumonia.
Cliff Nobles, 67, American pop musician, cancer.
Rudolf Pangsepp, 87, Estonian book designer and artist.
James E. Reilly, 60, American soap opera writer, complications from cardiac surgery.
John R. Reilly, 80, American lawyer, adviser to six Democratic presidential candidates, cancer.
Allan Rosenfield, 75, American physician, dean of Columbia University School of Public Health (1986–2008), amyotrophic lateral sclerosis.
Emil Steinberger, 79, American physician, lung cancer.

13
Khryss Adalia, 62, Filipino film, television and stage director, colorectal cancer.
*Pablo Barrachina Estevan, 95, Spanish bishop of Orihuela-Alicante (1954–1989).
Alexei Cherepanov, 19, Russian ice hockey player, acute cardiomyopathy.
Arthur J. Crowns, 86, American politician and academic lawyer.
Guillaume Depardieu, 37, French actor, pneumonia.
*Antonio José González Zumárraga, 83, Ecuadorian cardinal, stomach cancer.
Luciana Pignatelli, 73, Italian socialite, suicide.
Matthew John Rinaldo, 77, American politician, member of the House of Representatives (1973–1993), Parkinson's disease.
Paul Rogers, 87, American politician, member of the House of Representatives (1957–1979), lung cancer.
Frank Rosenthal, 79, American gaming executive, sports handicapper, inspiration for the 1995 film Casino, heart attack.
Eduardus Sangsun, 65, Indonesian bishop of Ruteng, heart attack.
Françoise Seigner, 80, French comedian and actress, pancreatic cancer.
Eduardo Serrano, 97, Venezuelan musician, conductor and composer.
Adam Watene, 31, Cook Islands rugby league player, heart attack.
Christopher Wicking, 65, British screenwriter.

14
Barrington J. Bayley, 71, British science fiction author, complications of colorectal cancer.
Richard Cooey, 41, American convicted murderer, executed by lethal injection.
Robert Furman, 93, American spy during World War II, foreign intelligence chief for Manhattan Project, metastatic melanoma.
Antonio Iannucci, 94, Italian archbishop of Pescara-Penne (1959–1990).
Ray Lowry, 64, British cartoonist and illustrator, after long illness.
Anne Mackenzie-Stuart, 78, British political activist.
Pat Moss, 73, British rally driver, sister of Stirling Moss, cancer.
Martin Peake, 2nd Viscount Ingleby, 82, British peer, activist for the disabled.
Kazimieras Petkevičius, 82, Lithuanian basketball player and coach.
Dame Daphne Purves, 99, New Zealand educator.

15
Edie Adams, 81, American actress (Li'l Abner, It's a Mad, Mad, Mad, Mad World, The Apartment), Tony winner (1957), pneumonia and cancer.
Fazıl Hüsnü Dağlarca, 94, Turkish poet, chronic renal failure.
Nathan Davis, 91, American actor.
Chris Mims, 38, American football player.
Jack Narz, 85, American game show host (Concentration), complications from strokes.
Suzzanna, 66, Indonesian actress, complications of diabetes.
Eddie Thompson, 68, British businessman, chairman of Dundee United, prostate cancer.
Des Townson, 74, New Zealand yacht designer, cancer.
Tom Tresh, 70, American baseball player (New York Yankees, Detroit Tigers), heart attack.
Roderick Walker, 76, British SAS commander.
Wang Yung-ching, 91, Taiwanese entrepreneur and billionaire, founder of Formosa Plastics.

16
Germán Abad Valenzuela, 89, Ecuadorian radiologist.
Ere Kokkonen, 70, Finnish film director, after illness.
David Lee, 70, Canadian sound engineer.
Paul L. Montgomery, 72, American journalist and reporter (The New York Times), cancer.
Dagmar Normet, 87, Estonian writer and translator.
Jack Reynolds, 71, American professional wrestling announcer (WWWF/WWF), complications from surgery.

17
George M. Keller, 84, American oil executive, founder of Chevron Corporation, complications from orthopedic surgery.
Prince Ludwig of Bavaria, 95, German prince, member of the House of Wittelsbach.
Urmas Ott, 53, Estonian journalist and television host, heart attack.
Santo Bartolomeo Quadri, 88, Italian archbishop of Modena-Nonantola (1983–1996).
Bill Reilly, 70, American publisher, founder of Primedia, bone and prostate cancer.
Levi Stubbs, 72, American vocalist (The Four Tops), complications of cancer and stroke.
Nick Weatherspoon, 58, American basketball player, natural causes.
Ben Weider, 85, Canadian bodybuilding promoter and Napoleon scholar.

18
Raymond Delacy Adams, 97, American neurologist and neuropathologist, heart failure.
Daniel Aguillón, 24, Mexican boxer, brain death caused by knockout.
*Evelyn Ay Sempier, 75, American beauty pageant winner, Miss America (1954), colorectal cancer. 
Salvatore Boccaccio, 70, Italian bishop of Frosinone-Veroli-Ferentino.
Albert Boime, 75, American art historian, myelofibrosis.
Alfredo E. Evangelista, 82, Filipino archaeologist, discovered the Laguna Copperplate Inscription.
Charley Fox, 88, Canadian pilot credited with strafing Erwin Rommel's car, car accident.
Peter Gordeno, 69, British actor, singer and dancer.
Tormod Haugen, 63, Norwegian children's author, after long illness.
E. K. Mawlong, 62, Indian politician, Chief Minister of Meghalaya (2000–2001).
Dave McKenna, 78, American jazz pianist, lung cancer.
Ralph Hanover, 28, Standardbred colt, euthanized.
James J. Rhoades, 66, American politician, member of the Pennsylvania State Senate since 1981, car accident.
Dee Dee Warwick, 66, American soul singer, sister of Dionne Warwick, after long illness.
Xie Jin, 84, Chinese film director.

19
Nazir Ahmed, 93, Indian scholar, writer, and teacher.
Richard Blackwell, 86, American fashion critic ("Mr. Blackwell's Ten Worst Dressed Women"), intestinal infection.
John A. Campbell, 67, Australian-born American lumber executive, president and CEO of Pacific Lumber Company, cancer.
Tony Dean, 67, American outdoors broadcaster, complications from appendectomy.
Marilyn Ferguson, 70, American writer (The Aquarian Conspiracy), heart attack.
Hal Kant, 77, American lawyer for the Grateful Dead, pancreatic cancer.
Lia Maivia, 81, Samoan wrestling promoter, wife of Peter Maivia, grandmother of Dwayne Johnson.
Harry T. Mangurian, Jr., 82, American businessman and horse breeder, former owner of the Boston Celtics, leukemia.
Mireille Marokvia, 99, French writer.
Rudy Ray Moore, 81, American comedian and actor (Dolemite), complications from diabetes.
Robert B. Nett, 86, American Medal of Honor recipient, after brief illness.
Nigel Plews, 74, British cricket umpire, renal cancer.
Gianni Raimondi, 85, Italian lyric tenor.
Gail Robinson, 62, American soprano, complications from rheumatoid arthritis.
Arthur Sendas, 72, Brazilian supermarket magnate, shot.
Lou Stringer, 91, American baseball player (Chicago Cubs and Boston Red Sox).
Doreen Wilber, 78, American archer, 1972 Olympic gold medallist, Alzheimer's disease.

20
Sœur Emmanuelle, 99, Belgian-born French nun, natural causes.
Shamsiah Fakeh, 84, Malaysian independence activist, lung infection.
Vittorio Foa, 98, Italian politician, journalist and writer.
James Gleeson, 92, Australian art critic and surrealist painter.
William Headline, 76, American CNN bureau chief, fall. 
Gene Hickerson, 73, American football player (Cleveland Browns) and member of the Pro Football Hall of Fame, after long illness.
Pat Kavanagh, 68, British literary agent, wife of Julian Barnes, brain tumour.
Joe Lutz, 83, American baseball player (St. Louis Browns), after long illness.
David Myers, 37, British rugby league player (Widnes and England), car accident.
John Ringham, 80, British actor.
Bobi Sourander, 79, Finnish-born Swedish journalist and author.
C. V. Sridhar, 73, Indian filmmaker, cardiac arrest.
Krzysztof Zaleski, 60, Polish actor, after long illness.

21
Muhammad Abdullah, 76, Bangladeshi academic.
Sonja Bernadotte, 64, German-born Swedish countess, breast cancer.
Alex Close, 86, Belgian road bicycle racer, winner of Tour of Belgium (1955) and Critérium du Dauphiné Libéré (1956).
Jake Crawford, 80, American Major League Baseball player.
George Edwards, 87, British footballer (Wales). 
Richard J. Keane, 75, American politician, member of the New York State Assembly.
Peter Levinson, 74, American music industry biographer, fall.
Ram Ruhee, 81, Mauritian founder of the National Olympic Committee, IOC member, after long illness.
James John Skinner, 85, Irish-born Zambian jurist and politician.

22
Robert Adlard, 92, British Olympic silver medal-winning (1948) field hockey player.
Robert C. Cannon, 91, American jurist.
William Warren Conolly, 87, Caymanian politician.
Lou Dorfsman, 90, American television graphic designer, heart failure.
David Evans, 73, British politician, MP (1987–1997), cancer. 
Jan Hijzelendoorn, 79, Dutch Olympic cyclist.
Ernest Kombo, 67, Congolese bishop of Owando, cancer.
David Lloyd Meredith, 74, British actor.
Paritosh Sen, 90, Indian artist, chronic obstructive pulmonary disease.

23
Gianluigi Braschi, 45, Italian film producer (Life Is Beautiful), after long illness.
Derek Brewer, 85, British mediaevalist.
Oszkár Csuvik, 83, Hungarian water polo player, Olympic silver medalist (1948).
Danny Dill, 83, American songwriter ("Long Black Veil"). 
Kevin Finnegan, 60, British former European middleweight champion boxer. 
E. Roger Muir, 89, American television producer, stroke.
Ivo Pukanić, 47, Croatian newspaper editor, assassination by car bomb.
F. W. Walbank, 98, British scholar of Greek history.

24
Moshe Cotel, 65, American pianist and composer, natural causes.
Howard French, 95, British newspaper editor.
Milton Katselas, 74, American film director, heart failure.
Premasiri Khemadasa, 71, Sri Lankan musician and composer.
Geoffrey McLean, 77, British police officer.
Merl Saunders, 74, American keyboardist (The Grateful Dead), collaborator with Jerry Garcia, complications from a stroke.
Xiao Ke, 101, Chinese general in the People's Liberation Army, illness.
Helmut Zilk, 81, Austrian politician, Mayor of Vienna (1984–1994), heart failure.

25
John Axon, 48, British actor (The Royal), grandson of John Axon, heart attack.
Allen Blanchard, 79, Australian politician.
Gerard Damiano, 80, American adult film director (Deep Throat), stroke.
Colm Farrelly, 55, Irish record producer who discovered Sinéad O'Connor and The Pale, after short illness.
Bob Gambold, 79, American football player (Los Angeles Rams, Philadelphia Eagles).
Irwin Gunsalus, 96, American biochemist, heart failure.
Amos E. Joel, Jr., 90, American inventor, pioneer of the cellphone.
Federico Luzzi, 28, Italian tennis player, leukemia.
Muslim Magomayev, 66, Azerbaijani singer.
Ian McColl, 81, British footballer, team manager for Scotland, natural causes.
Anne Pressly, 26, American television news anchor (KATV), injuries during home invasion.
Regal Intention, 23, Canadian Champion Thoroughbred racehorse.
Estelle Reiner, 94, American singer and actress (When Harry Met Sally...).
Hal Roth, 81, American sailor and author, lung cancer.
Tahereh Saffarzadeh, 72, Iranian poet and academic, cancer.
Maurice Stonefrost, 81, British civil servant.

26
Abu Ghadiya, 29-30, Syrian militant, shot.
Delfino Borroni, 110, Italian last known World War I veteran from Italy.
Gábor Delneky, 76, Hungarian Olympic fencer.
P. Cameron DeVore, 76, American First Amendment attorney, apparent heart attack.
Eileen Donaghy, 78, Irish singer, cancer.
Thomas Dunn, 82, American conductor, heart failure.
Tony Hillerman, 83, American mystery writer, pulmonary failure.
S. D. Jones, 63, Antiguan professional wrestler, stroke.
Pablo Montes, 62, Cuban athlete, heart attack.
Delmar Watson, 82, American child actor (Mr. Smith Goes to Washington), prostate cancer.

27
Dean Barnett, 41, American columnist and blogger, complications from cystic fibrosis.
Chris Bryant, 72, British screenwriter and actor.
Richard Carr-Gomm, 86, British soldier and philanthropist.
Charles Dubin, 87, Canadian Chief Justice of Ontario (1990–1996), head of the Dubin Inquiry into drugs in sport, pneumonia. 
Ray Ellis, 85, American musician, conductor and television producer, complications from melanoma.
Jack Houston, 90, Australian politician, member of the Legislative Assembly of Queensland (1957–1980).
Karl Kassulke, 67, American football player (Minnesota Vikings), heart attack.
Heinz Krügel, 87, German footballer and coach, after long illness.
Ed Levy, 91, American baseball player (Philadelphia Phillies, New York Yankees).
Es'kia Mphahlele, 88, South African writer and academic, natural causes.
Frank Nagai, 76, Japanese singer. 
Bernard W. Rogers, 87, American general, Commander of the US European Command (1979–1987).
Louis Secco, 81, Canadian Olympic gold medal-winning (1952) ice hockey player.
Roy Stewart, 83, Jamaican-born British actor (Live and Let Die, Doctor Who). 
Andy Young, 83, Scottish footballer (Raith Rovers).

28
Buck Adams, 52, American pornographic actor and director, complications from heart failure.
Dina Cocea, 95, Romanian actress, heart attack.
*Kung Te-cheng, 88, Chinese-born Taiwanese 77th generation descendant of Confucius, heart and respiratory failure.
Alexander Lowen, 97, American psychotherapist.
Bill Martin, 65, American realist painter, complications of lymphoma.
Eric Nenno, 47, American murderer and sex offender, execution by lethal injection.
*Pak Song-chol, 95, North Korean politician, Premier (1976–1977), after long illness.
Paul Pesthy, 70, American Olympic modern pentathlete and fencer.
Augusto Petró, 90, Brazilian bishop of Uruguaiana (1964–1995), complications from Alzheimer's disease.
John Ripley, 69, American Marine war hero.
Allan Scott, 85, Australian businessman and road transport magnate, complications from diabetes and heart condition.
George Sopkin, 94, American cellist, natural causes.
Ilus Vay, 85, Hungarian actress.

29
William Addison, 74, American chess player.
Shirwa Ahmed, 26, Somali-American bomber, detonation.
Gerald Arpino, 85, American dancer and choreographer, after long illness.
Mike Baker, 45, American singer (Shadow Gallery), heart attack.
Cor Brom, 76, Dutch footballer and coach, Parkinson's disease.
Anita Ellis, 88, Canadian-born American singer and actress, complications from Alzheimer's disease. (Death announced on this date).
Yiannis Koskiniatis, 25, Greek footballer, suicide by jumping.
Mae Mercer, 76, American blues singer.
William Wharton, 82, American painter and novelist (Birdy), infection.

30
Edith Evans Asbury, 98, American journalist (The New York Times), after long illness.
Fred Baron, 61, American trial lawyer and political fundraiser, multiple myeloma. 
Robert H. Barrow, 86, American general, 27th Commandant of the Marine Corps (1979–1983).
Cundo Bermúdez, 94, Cuban artist.
Valentin Bubukin, 75, Russian footballer, after long illness.
John Cuckney, Baron Cuckney, 83, British financier and industrialist.
David Jeaffreson, 76, British colonial official, Hong Kong Secretary for Security (1982–1988), ICAC Commissioner (1988–1991).
Tom Moody, 78, American politician. Mayor of Columbus, Ohio (1972–1984).
Julius Neave, 89, British insurance executive.

31
Jonathan Bates, 68, British sound engineer.
John Daly, 71, British film producer, cancer.
Frank Navetta, 46, American guitarist (Descendents).
Sir John Page, 89, British politician, MP for Harrow West (1960–1987).
John Pearse, 69, British guitarist.
Studs Terkel, 96, American broadcaster and author (The Good War), complications from a fall.

References

2008-10
 10